Ashok Kumar (born 20 July 1983) is a professional golfer from India, currently playing on the Professional Golf Tour of India, where he was the 2003/04 and the 2006/07 Order of Merit winner.

In 2004, he won the Hero Honda Golf Tour Order of Merit for the 2003/04 season. He won it again in 2006/07 and in 2010 under the name of the PGTI after recording 5 wins in 8 events played, where he finished in the top-10 in all 8 of them.

Kumar played in 12 events in 2008, but did not record a win, finishing in the top-10 8 times.

Kumar added another win in 2009 in April at the All India Match Play Championship.

Professional wins (18)

Professional Golf Tour of India wins (13)

Hero Honda Golf Tour wins (3)
2004 The Hindu Open, Hero Honda Open, PGAI-TSM Open

Other wins (2)
1999 Ericsson International Golf Invitation Tournament
2008 BILT Open Pro-Am

Team appearances
Amateur
Eisenhower Trophy (representing India): 2000
Bonallack Trophy (representing Asia/Pacific): 2000

External links
Profile on PGTI's official site

Indian male golfers
Golfers from Bihar
1983 births
Living people